Nate Becker (born March 24, 1996) is an American football tight end for the Arlington Renegades of the XFL. He played college football for the Miami (OH) RedHawks.

Professional career

Detroit Lions
Becker was signed by the Detroit Lions as an undrafted free agent on May 10, 2019. He was cut two days later.

Buffalo Bills
Becker was signed by the Buffalo Bills on June 5, 2019. He was waived at the end of training camp during final roster cuts, but was re-signed by the team to their practice squad on September 2, 2019. He was waived again by the team shortly afterwards but was re-signed to the practice squad on September 12 and remained there for the rest of his rookie season. Becker was signed to a reserve/futures contract at the end of the season on January 6, 2020.

Becker was again cut at the end of preseason training camp in 2020 and was re-signed to the practice squad a few weeks later on September 23, 2020. He was elevated to the active roster on January 2, 2021, for the team's week 17 game against the Miami Dolphins, and reverted to the practice squad after the game. On January 26, 2021, Becker signed a reserves/futures contract with the Bills.

Becker was released by the Bills on August 31, 2021.

Carolina Panthers
On August 11, 2022, Becker signed with the Carolina Panthers. He was waived three days later.

Green Bay Packers
On August 16, 2022, Becker was claimed off waivers by the Green Bay Packers. He was waived/injured on August 30, 2022 and placed on injured reserve. He was released off injured reserve on September 2, 2022.

References

External links
Green Bay Packers bio
Miami RedHawks bio

1996 births
Living people
American football tight ends
Buffalo Bills players
Carolina Panthers players
Detroit Lions players
Green Bay Packers players
Miami RedHawks football players
Players of American football from Indiana